The 1955–56 Maccabi Jaffa season was the club's 7th season since its establishment in 1949.

At the start of the season, the league which started during the previous season was completed, with the club finishing 1st in its division and qualifying to the promotion/relegation play-offs against the 10th and 11th placed clubs in Liga Alef, Beitar Jerusalem and Hapoel Kfar Saba, and the Liga Bet North winners, Hapoel Kiryat Haim. Maccabi Jaffa topped the play-offs table and was promoted, for the first time in its existence, to the top division.

At the end of the season, the club placed 10th (out of 12) in the league, which meant the club had to face promotion/relegation play-offs against the first placed team from Liga Alef, Hakoah Tel Aviv. Maccabi Jaffa won both play-off matches and stayed in Liga Leumit.

Match Results

Legend

1954–55 Liga Bet (south division)
The league began on 8 January 1955, and by the time the previous season ended, only 18 rounds of matches were completed, with the final 4 rounds being played during September and October 1955.

Final table

Matches

Results by match

Promotion/relegation play-offs

Table

Maccabi Jaffa promoted to Liga Leumit

Matches

1955–56 Liga Leumit

Final table

Matches

Results by match

Promotion/relegation play-offs

Maccabi Jaffa won 4–1 on aggregate and remained in Liga Leumit. Hakoah Tel Aviv remained in Liga Alef.

References

Maccabi Jaffa F.C. seasons
Maccabi Jaffa